Platymera is a genus of crabs in the family Calappidae, containing the following species:
 Platymera californiensis Rathbun, 1894
 Platymera gaudichaudii H. Milne Edwards, 1837

References

Calappoidea
Taxa named by Henri Milne-Edwards